Rahat Hayat (born October 23), better known by his stage name DJ Rahat, is a Bangladeshi DJ. He has opened a School for DJs in Bangladesh.

Music career

Rahat started his career at 2004 and came to media focus when he was a regular DJ at Fantasy Kingdom at Dhaka. He has performed all over the Bangladesh. In 2007 he featured in the song Bondhu by Nancy. In March 2009 he released Abhimaner Deyal with Julie. He has performed in the 2011 Cricket World Cup and the 2014 ICC World Twenty20. He has released 8 album, featuring most renowned artist of Bangladesh, like: Partha Barua, Dilruba Khan, Kumar Biswajit, Nancy, Oyshee, Konal, Fahmida Nobi, Bappa Mazumder, Pantho kanai, Alif Alauddin, Muhin, Baul Shafi Mondol, Shuvo, Onita, Liton, Mukta, Lemis, Nishita Barua, Kona, Uptown Lokolz, Bangla Mentalz and others. In June 2017 he released a single with Tanjib Sarowar.

Discography

Lampor Alo - 2006
Asar Srabon - 2007
After 190 Days - 2008
Flashback - 2009
All Time - 2012
Guru Go - 2014
DJ Rahat with Stars - 2016
DJ Rahat Hits- 2016
DJ Rahat feat Oyshee (Mise Gecho) - 2017
DJ Rahat Hits

Lampor Alo (2006)

Asar Srabon (2007)

Ater 190 Days (2008)

Flashback – Bd Film N Rhythm (2009)

Guru Go (2014)

DJ Rahat Hits (2016)

DJ Rahat With Stars (2016)

Mise Gecho (2017)

References 

Living people
Bangladeshi DJs
Bangladeshi male musicians
People from Pabna District
Year of birth missing (living people)